Matudina is a genus of flowering plants in the tribe Eupatorieae within the family Asteraceae.

The genus is named for Dr. Eizi Matuda (1894-1978) of the Universidad Nacional Autónoma de México. There is only one known species, Matudina corvi, native to the State of Chiapas in southern Mexico

References

Monotypic Asteraceae genera
Eupatorieae
Flora of Chiapas